Jyl-Kol is a village in Jalal-Abad Region of Kyrgyzstan. It is part of the Aksy District. The village's population was 1,094 in 2021.

Population

References
 

Populated places in Jalal-Abad Region